These are the results of the women's balance beam competition, one of six events for female competitors in artistic gymnastics at the 1984 Summer Olympics in Los Angeles.  The qualification and final rounds took place on July 30, August 1 and 5 at UCLA’s Pauley Pavilion.

Medalists

Results
Sixty-five gymnasts competed in the compulsory and optional rounds on July 30 and August 1.  The eight highest scoring gymnasts advanced to the final on August 5.  Each country was limited to two competitors in the final.  Half of the points earned by each gymnast during both the compulsory and optional rounds carried over to the final.  This constitutes the "prelim" score.

References
Official Olympic Report
www.gymnasticsresults.com
www.gymn-forum.net

Women's balance beam
1984 in women's gymnastics
Women's events at the 1984 Summer Olympics